Jefferson College is a community college in Jefferson County, Missouri, in the city of Hillsboro. As of Fall 2019, Jefferson College enrollment includes 4,179 full and part-time college credit students.

History
The history of Jefferson College began in the spring of 1961 with the passage of Senate Bill Number Seven, presented by Senator Earl Blackwell of Hillsboro, made possible the formation and financing of public junior colleges in Missouri. Several Jefferson County citizens began to recognize the need for a public junior college in their community, they met, organized and petitioned the State Board of Education for the formation of a Junior College District. The Community College District of Jefferson County was voted into existence on April 2, 1963.

Classes were first held at Hillsboro High School in 1964 until the following year (1965) when the college moved to its present 400+ acre campus on Highway 21 near Hillsboro. Jefferson College became the second junior college district in Missouri to be approved.

Accreditation 
Jefferson College is accredited by The Higher Learning Commission, A Commission of the North Central Association of Colleges and Schools.

Campus locations

Main Campus 
The Main Campus is located in Jefferson County, with a portion in the city of Hillsboro and most of it in an unincorporated area.

It includes the following features: the Library-Administration Building, Career & Technical Education Building, Fine Arts Building, Technology Center (established 1986), Arts and Sciences Building, Arts and Sciences II, Field House, Athletic Fields, Student Center, Area Technical School, and Student Housing [Viking Woods].
JC Online, was formally established in 2010 as the college's virtual campus, providing a full range of classes and e-services to students who prefer this highly popular method of instruction.

Jefferson College Arnold 
Jefferson College Arnold is located in Arnold.

Jefferson College Arnold was opened in 2007 to expand educational services to those in northern Jefferson County. The  facility is located at 1687 Missouri State Road behind the Arnold Library and Recreation Center.

Jefferson College Imperial 

Jefferson College Imperial opened in 2010. The  building is located at 4400 Jeffco Boulevard and is home to the Law Enforcement Academy, EMT-Paramedic programs.

Academics 
Jefferson Community College offers degree programs in the following programs.
 Associate of Arts Degree: The Associate of Arts A.A. degree is a program of general studies designed to transfer to four-year institutions. Many subjects are offered.
 Associate of Arts in Teaching Degree:  The A.A.T. degree is designed to transfer into a four-year Teacher Education program for those who want to be certified to teach early childhood, elementary, middle school, or secondary education.
 Associate of Science Degree - Pre-Engineering: The A.S. degree is designed to transfer to an engineering institution, specifically the Missouri University of Science and Technology.
 Associate of Applied Science Degree: The A.A.S. degree includes a variety of career and technical education programs not generally designed for transfer.  The A.A.S. degree generally provides the option to pursue either a degree or a certificate.
Associate of Fine Arts (A.F.A.) degree is designed for transfer to another college or university as part of a bachelor's degree in fine arts.
Associate of Fine Arts in Music (A.F.A.) degree is designed for transfer to another college or university as part of a bachelor's degree in music. Music Department

Jefferson College Area Technical School  
The Area Technical School provides career programs to help area high school students develop:
 Occupational Skills necessary to secure initial employment in the field after graduation from high school
 A Background of related information including both theory and practice necessary for a field of choice
 Personal and Social Traits necessary for initial employment
 Leadership Skills to help students learn the importance of leadership in the workplace.

Multiple programs are available at the Area Technical School in careers such as Automotive Technology, Biomedical Sciences, Building Repair Technology, Computer Integrated Manufacturing, Culinary Arts, Digital Media Technology, Early Childhood and Elementary Education, Fire Science, Health Services, HVAC, Metal Fabrication, Residential Carpentry and Welding Technology

Music, Theater and Fine Arts 
Jefferson College PACE Series offers cultural programs and events for the people of Jefferson County to attend and enjoy concerts, plays, musicals and gallery exhibits. Nationally acclaimed guest artists perform in addition to the college's music and theater performances.

Athletics 
Jefferson College is a member of the National Junior College Athletic Association Division I, NJCAA Region XVI and the Missouri Community College Athletic Conference.
The college fields teams in men's baseball and soccer, and women's basketball, soccer, softball and volleyball. The teams are known as the Vikings.

Jefferson College Foundation 
The mission of the Jefferson College Foundation is to support the growth and development of Jefferson College in ways that are beneficial to its students, faculty, staff and campus facilities.  Founded in 1991, the Foundation continues to build relationships within the community, and making a positive difference in the lives of others through learning and cultural enrichment.  The Foundation supports the educational opportunities at Jefferson College by hosting fun and exciting events. Proceeds from the events help provide scholarships for talented and deserving students in need of assistance. The Foundation also provides quality entertainment for members of the community and their families.

Student life

Victor the Viking is the Mascot of Jefferson College.

Student media 
Jefferson College Television (JCTV) provides educational opportunities in broadcast journalism.

Student organizations 
The Office of Student Development includes a variety of clubs and organizations on campus that provide students the opportunity to participate as members and/or take leadership roles.  In addition, students are made aware of volunteer opportunities available within the community.

Student Senate 
The Jefferson College Student Senate is a group of 16 students who are elected to represent the students of Jefferson College. Each senator serves a minimum of 2 hours each week in the Senate office in the Student Center.

Phi Theta Kappa 

The Xi Zeta Chapter of Jefferson College is the established chapter for Jefferson College graduates.

Student chapter of NAfME 

Jefferson College NAfME

This is the official college chapter or NAFME at Jefferson College for any music student planning to enter the field of music education.

Active Minds at Jefferson College 

Active Minds is an organization working to utilize the student voice to change the conversation about mental health on college campuses.

Jefferson College Psychology Club 
A club for students who have an interest in the field of psychology.

Legion of Gamers 
A club dedicated to Jefferson College students who are gamers.

Library 
The Jefferson College Library has a book collection of over 70,000 volumes. The library's collection includes print periodicals, best sellers, graphic novels, DVDs, music CDs, eBooks and audiobooks. The library is also home to the Jefferson County History Center, which serves as an archive for Jefferson County. The history center is used for genealogical research by residents of Jefferson County, Missouri. Jefferson College Library serves as a selective federal depository for Missouri's Third Congressional District through its participation in the Federal Depository Library Program. Many government publications are available in the library in either a paper or an electronic format.

References

External links
 

 
Educational institutions established in 1963
Education in Jefferson County, Missouri
Buildings and structures in Jefferson County, Missouri
1963 establishments in Missouri
Community colleges in Missouri